Goniops is a genus of horse and deer flies in the family Tabanidae.

Distribution
Canada, United States.

References

Tabanidae
Brachycera genera
Insects described in 1892
Diptera of North America
Taxa named by John Merton Aldrich
Taxa named by Carl Robert Osten-Sacken